Lara Vadlau (born 29 March 1994) is an Austrian competitive sailor.

She was born in Feldbach, Austria, on 29 March 1994. At the 2012 Summer Olympics, she competed in the women's 470 class where, alongside crewmate Eva-Maria Schimak, she finished 20th.

References

External links
 
 
 

1994 births
Living people
Austrian female sailors (sport)
Olympic sailors of Austria
Sailors at the 2012 Summer Olympics – 470
Sailors at the 2010 Summer Youth Olympics
Byte CII class sailors
470 class world champions
Sailors at the 2016 Summer Olympics – 470
World champions in sailing for Austria
Youth Olympic gold medalists for Austria